Gravity Happens is the third studio album by Kate Voegele, released on May 17, 2011 on MySpace Records and ATO Records in the United States. The album debuted at number 56 on the Billboard 200 albums chart.

Singles
"Heart in Chains", the first single from the album, was released on May 17, 2011. The song premiered during the episode of One Tree Hill aired on that same day. The music video had already been shot, confirmed on Voegele's Twitter. In a still of the video, Voegele blows a kiss with what seems like a forest behind her.

Track listing

References

External links
Kate Voegele's official website
Kate Voegele's official Myspace

Kate Voegele albums
2011 albums